Pulaski Middle School may refer to a number of middle schools including:

 Dunbar-Pulaski Middle School, Gary, Indiana, part of Gary Community School Corporation
 Pulaski Middle School, New Britain, Connecticut, part of New Britain School District
 Pulaski Middle School, Pulaski, Virginia, part of Pulaski County Public Schools

See also
 Pulaski (disambiguation)
 Pulaski High School